Senator Ligon may refer to:

Robert F. Ligon (1823–1901), Alabama State Senate
William Ligon (born 1961), Georgia State Senate